Eucithara turricula is a small sea snail, a marine gastropod mollusk in the family Mangeliidae.

Description
The length of the shell attains 12.5 mm; its diameter 4.7 mm.

The whorls are rather flat  The sutures are deep. The shoulder is very narrow. The color of the shell is whitish, sometimes with a central brown band, with fine brown revolving lines, invisible except with a lens.

Distribution
This marine species occurs off the Philippines.

References

  Reeve, L.A. 1846. Monograph of the genus Mangelia. pls 1–8 in Reeve, L.A. (ed). Conchologia Iconica. London : L. Reeve & Co. Vol. 3.

External links
  Tucker, J.K. 2004 Catalog of recent and fossil turrids (Mollusca: Gastropoda). Zootaxa 682:1-1295
 Kilburn R.N. 1992. Turridae (Mollusca: Gastropoda) of southern Africa and Mozambique. Part 6. Subfamily Mangeliinae, section 1. Annals of the Natal Museum, 33: 461–575

turricula
Gastropods described in 1846